Eliza Smith (died 1732?) was one of the most popular female 18th-century cookery book writers. Unlike other popular woman cookbook authors whose books overlapped with hers, such as Hannah Glasse, nothing seems to be known about her personal life beyond the fact that she was one of the first popular female cookbook authors. Her one book, The Compleat Housewife, or, Accomplished Gentlewoman's Companion (London: J. Pemberton, 1727), went through 18 editions in Britain and in 1742 Smith became the first cookbook author published in colonial America. Prior to her death, the name published in her book was E___ S. After her death it was published as E. Smith. She was a housekeeper for thirty years: "for the Space of Thirty Years and upwards ... I have been constantly employed in fashionable and noble Families."

References
 
 Montagu of Beaulieu, Lord, "Foreword" in E. Smith, The Compleat Housewife or Accomplish'd Gentlewoman's Companion (facsimile ed. Literary Services and Production Ltd., 1968. )
 Theophano, Janet, "Eat My Words: Reading Women's Lives Through the Cookbooks They Wrote", St. Martins Press, New York,  p. 194.

External links
 Google Books text of the 9th edition (1739) of The Compleat Housewife, including the author's preface

English food writers
English non-fiction writers
17th-century births
1730s deaths
Women cookbook writers
18th-century English women writers
18th-century English writers
English women non-fiction writers